Katy Kurtzman (born September 16, 1965) is an American actress and modelist.

Biography

Kurtzman was born in Washington, D.C. on September 16, 1965, and began her career as a child actress. In 1977, Michael Landon cast Kurtzman as stuttering Anna (who was abused by Nellie) in the third-season episode "The Music Box" on Little House on the Prairie. She also starred in the "Little House on the Prairie" fourth season episode "I Remember, I Remember" with Matthew Laborteaux, playing young Caroline and young Charles, respectively. This episode aired on January 23, 1978, and is Production # 4016.

She is probably best remembered for her roles as Heidi in The New Adventures of Heidi (1978) and as Lindsay Blaisdel in the television drama Dynasty (1981). She starred in the NBC pilot Allison Sydney Harrison with Ted Danson, playing an amateur detective. She played Nettie in episode 21 (The Scavengers) of How the West Was Won. In 2001, she wrote and directed the 14-minute short titled The Pool Boy. Her most recent acting role came in 2013 when she guest-starred on an episode of Grey's Anatomy.

Filmography

Little House on the Prairie (1977 and 1978) (TV)
Mulligan's Stew (1977)
ABC Afterschool Specials - Very Good Friends/Beat The Turtle Drum (1977)
The Awakening Land (1978)
When Every Day Was the Fourth of July (1978)
Child of Glass (1978)
Hunters of the Reef (1978)
The New Adventures of Heidi (1978)
Long Journey Back (1978)
Donovan's Kid (1979)
Sex and the Single Parent (1979)
Diary of a Teenage Hitchhiker (1979)
Hawaii Five-0 (1979)
Trapper John, M.D. (1980)
Dynasty (1981)
God, Sex & Apple Pie (1998)
Out in Fifty (1999)
The Pool Boy (2001)
Strong Medicine (2004)
Grey's Anatomy (2013)

References

External links

Katy Kurtzman interview
2011 Katy Kurtzman interview

1965 births
American child actresses
American film directors
American television actresses
American soap opera actresses
American women film directors
Living people
Actresses from Washington, D.C.
20th-century American actresses
21st-century American actresses